Cooper Middle School may refer to:

William John Cooper Academy, a middle school in Fresno, California
James Fenimore Cooper Middle School, a school in Fairfax county
Cooper Middle School (Georgia), a school in Austell, Georgia
Cooper Middle School (Oklahoma City), a middle school in Oklahoma City, Oklahoma in the Putnam City School District.
Cooper Middle School (Illinois)